In mathematical physics and mathematics, the Pauli matrices are a set of three  complex matrices which are Hermitian, involutory and unitary.  Usually indicated by the Greek letter sigma, they are occasionally denoted by tau when used in connection with isospin symmetries.

These matrices are named after the physicist Wolfgang Pauli. In quantum mechanics, they occur in the Pauli equation which takes into account the interaction of the spin of a particle with an external electromagnetic field. They also represent the interaction states of two polarization filters for horizontal/vertical polarization, 45 degree polarization (right/left), and circular polarization (right/left).

Each Pauli matrix is Hermitian, and together with the identity matrix  (sometimes considered as the zeroth Pauli matrix ), the Pauli matrices form a basis for the real vector space of  Hermitian matrices. 
This means that any  Hermitian matrix can be written in a unique way as a linear combination of Pauli matrices, with all coefficients being real numbers.

Hermitian operators represent observables in quantum mechanics, so the Pauli matrices span the space of observables of the complex -dimensional Hilbert space. In the context of Pauli's work,  represents the observable corresponding to spin along the th coordinate axis in three-dimensional Euclidean space  

Algebraic properties 

All three of the Pauli matrices can be compacted into a single expression:

The matrices are involutory:

where  is the identity matrix.

The determinants and traces of the Pauli matrices are:

From which, we can deduce that each matrix   has eigenvalues +1 and −1.

Eigenvectors and eigenvalues 
The corresponding normalized eigenvectors are:

Pauli vector 
The Pauli vector is defined by

The Pauli vector provides a mapping mechanism from a vector basis to a Pauli matrix basis as follows,

using Einstein's summation convention. 

This makes the Pauli matrices intertwiners from the point of view of representation theory.

Completeness relation 

Each component of  can be recovered from the matrix (see completeness relation below) 

This constitutes an inverse to the map , making it manifest that the map is a bijection.

Determinant 

The norm is given by the determinant (up to a minus sign)

Then considering the conjugation action of an  matrix  on this space of matrices,
,
we find , and that  is Hermitian and traceless. In fact, it turns out that the special restriction on  implies that the rotation is orientation preserving. This allows the definition of a map  given by
,
where . The components of  can be recovered using the tracing process above:

Cross-product 

The cross-product is given by the matrix commutator (up to a factor of )

In fact, the existence of a norm follows from the fact that  is a Lie algebra: see Killing form.

This cross-product can be used to prove the orientation-preserving property of the map above.

Eigenvalues and eigenvectors 

This follows immediately from tracelessness and explicitly computing the determinant.

A standard result in linear algebra (a linear map which satisfies a polynomial equation written in distinct linear factors is diagonal) means this implies  is diagonal with possible eigenvalues . The tracelessness of  means it has exactly one of each eigenvalue.

Its normalized eigenvectors are

Pauli 4-vector 

The Pauli 4-vector, used in spinor theory, is written  with components

which also encodes the Minkowski metric (with mostly minus convention) in its determinant:

This 4-vector also has a completeness relation. It is convenient to define a second Pauli 4-vector

and allow raising and lowering using the Minkowski metric tensor. The relation can then be written

For  matrices, the following identity holds:

That is, the 'cross-terms' can be written as traces. When  are chosen to be different , the cross-terms vanish. It then follows, now showing summation explicitly,

(Anti-)Commutation relations 
The Pauli matrices obey the following commutation relations:

where the structure constant  is the Levi-Civita symbol and Einstein summation notation is used.

These commutation relations make the Pauli matrices the generators of a representation of the Lie algebra 

They also satisfy the anticommutation relations:

The usual construction of generators  of  using the Clifford algebra recovers the commutation relations above, up to unimportant numerical factors.

A few explicit commutators and anti-commutators are given below as examples:

Relation to dot and cross product
Pauli vectors elegantly map these commutation and anticommutation relations to corresponding vector products.  Adding the commutator to the anticommutator gives

so that,  

Finally, translating the index notation for the dot product and cross product results in 

If  is identified with the pseudoscalar  then the right hand side becomes  which is also the definition for the product of two vectors in  geometric algebra.

Some trace relations 
The following traces can be derived using the commutation and anticommutation relations.

If the matrix  is also considered, these relationships become

Exponential of a Pauli vector
For 

one has, for even powers, 

which can be shown first for the  case using the anticommutation relations. For convenience, the case  is taken to be  by convention.

For odd powers, 

Matrix exponentiating, and using the Taylor series for sine and cosine,
.

In the last line, the first sum is the cosine, while the second sum is the sine; so, finally,

which is analogous to Euler's formula, extended to quaternions.

Note that
,

while the determinant of the exponential itself is just , which makes it the generic group element of SU(2).

A more abstract version of formula  for a general  matrix can be found in the article on matrix exponentials.

The group composition law of 
A straightforward application of  formula   provides a parameterization of the composition law of  the group .

which specifies the generic group multiplication, where, manifestly,  

the spherical law of cosines.  Given , then, 

Consequently, the composite rotation parameters in this group element (a closed form of the respective BCH expansion in this case) simply amount to 

Adjoint action
It is also straightforward to likewise work out the adjoint action on the Pauli vector, namely rotation of any angle  along any axis :

Taking the dot product of any unit vector with the above formula generates the expression of any single qubit operator under any rotation. For example, it can be shown that .

Completeness relation 
An alternative notation that is commonly used for the Pauli matrices is to write the vector index  in the superscript, and the matrix indices as subscripts, so that the element in row  and column  of the -th Pauli matrix is 

In this notation, the completeness relation for the Pauli matrices can be written

As noted above, it is common to denote the 2 × 2 unit matrix by  so  The completeness relation can alternatively be expressed as

The fact that any Hermitian complex 2 × 2 matrices can be expressed in terms of the identity matrix and the Pauli matrices also leads to the Bloch sphere representation of 2 × 2 mixed states’ density matrix, (positive semidefinite 2 × 2 matrices with unit trace.

For a pure state, in polar coordinates,  the idempotent density matrix

acts on the state eigenvector  with eigenvalue +1, hence it acts like a projection operator.

Relation with the permutation operator 
Let  be the transposition (also known as a permutation) between two spins  and  living in the tensor product space 

This operator can also be written more explicitly as Dirac's spin exchange operator,

Its eigenvalues are therefore 1 or −1. It may thus be utilized as an interaction term in a Hamiltonian, splitting the energy eigenvalues of its symmetric versus antisymmetric eigenstates.

SU(2) 
The group SU(2) is the Lie group of unitary  matrices with unit determinant; its Lie algebra is the set of all  anti-Hermitian matrices  with trace 0.  Direct calculation, as above, shows that the Lie algebra  is the 3-dimensional real algebra spanned by the set . In compact notation,

As a result, each  can be seen as an infinitesimal generator of SU(2). The elements of SU(2) are exponentials of linear combinations of these three generators, and multiply as indicated above in discussing the Pauli vector. The conventional normalization is  so that

As SU(2) is a compact group, its Cartan decomposition is trivial.

SO(3) 
The Lie algebra  is isomorphic to the Lie algebra , which corresponds to the Lie group SO(3), the group of rotations in three-dimensional space.

Quaternions 

Alternatively, the isomorphism can be achieved by a map using the Pauli matrices in reversed order,

Physics

Classical mechanics 

In classical mechanics, Pauli matrices are useful in the context of the Cayley-Klein parameters. The matrix  corresponding to the position  of a point in space is defined in terms of the above Pauli vector matrix,  

Consequently, the transformation matrix  for rotations about the -axis through an angle  may be written in terms of Pauli matrices and the unit matrix as

Similar expressions follow for general Pauli vector rotations as detailed above.

Quantum mechanics 

In quantum mechanics, each Pauli matrix is related to an angular momentum operator that corresponds to an observable describing the spin of a spin  particle, in each of the three spatial directions.  As an immediate consequence of the Cartan decomposition mentioned above,  are the generators of a projective representation (spin representation) of the rotation group SO(3) acting on non-relativistic particles with spin . The states of the particles are represented as two-component spinors. In the same way, the Pauli matrices are related to the isospin operator.

An interesting property of spin  particles is that they must be rotated by an angle of 4 in order to return to their original configuration.  This is due to the two-to-one correspondence between SU(2) and SO(3) mentioned above, and the fact that, although one visualizes spin up/down as the north/south pole on the 2-sphere  they are actually represented by orthogonal vectors in the two dimensional complex Hilbert space.

By taking Kronecker products of this representation with itself repeatedly, one may construct all higher irreducible representations. That is, the  resulting spin operators for higher spin systems in three spatial dimensions, for arbitrarily large j,  can be calculated using this spin operator and ladder operators. The analog formula to the above generalization of Euler's formula for Pauli matrices, the group element in terms of spin matrices, is tractable, but less simple.

Also useful in the quantum mechanics of multiparticle systems, the general Pauli group  is defined to consist of all -fold tensor products of Pauli matrices.

Relativistic quantum mechanics 
In relativistic quantum mechanics, the spinors in four dimensions are 4 × 1 (or 1 × 4) matrices. Hence the Pauli matrices or the Sigma matrices operating on these spinors have to be 4 × 4 matrices. They are defined in terms of 2 × 2 Pauli matrices as

It follows from this definition that the  matrices have the same algebraic properties as the  matrices.

However, relativistic angular momentum is not a three-vector, but a second order four-tensor. Hence  needs to be replaced by  the generator of Lorentz transformations on spinors. Hence there are only six independent matrices.

The first three are the  The remaining three,  where the Dirac  matrices are defined as

The relativistic spin matrices  are written in  compact form in terms of commutator of gamma matrices as

Quantum information 
In quantum information, single-qubit quantum gates are 2 × 2 unitary matrices.  The Pauli matrices are some of the most important single-qubit operations.  In that context, the Cartan decomposition given above is called the "Z–Y decomposition of a single-qubit gate". Choosing a different Cartan pair gives a similar "X–Y ''decomposition of a single-qubit gate".

See also 
Algebra of physical space
Spinors in three dimensions
 Gamma matrices
 
 Angular momentum
 Gell-Mann matrices
 Poincaré group
 Generalizations of Pauli matrices
 Bloch sphere
 Euler's four-square identity
 For higher spin generalizations of the Pauli matrices, see 
 Exchange matrix (the first Pauli matrix is an exchange matrix of order two)

Remarks

Notes

References 

Lie groups
Matrices
Rotational symmetry
Articles containing proofs
Mathematical physics